Elisa Brocard (born 27 October 1984 in Aosta) is an Italian cross-country skier who has competed since 2001.

Skiing career
At the 2010 Winter Olympics in Vancouver, she finished 43rd in the individual sprint event. At the FIS Nordic World Ski Championships 2009 in Liberec, Brocard finished 32nd in the individual sprint. Her best World Cup finish is sixth in a team sprint event at Germany in 2008 while her best individual finish is 16th in an individual sprint event, also at the same event in Germany.

Cross-country skiing results
All results are sourced from the International Ski Federation (FIS).

Olympic Games

World Championships

World Cup

Season standings

References

External links
 

1984 births
Cross-country skiers at the 2010 Winter Olympics
Cross-country skiers at the 2014 Winter Olympics
Cross-country skiers at the 2018 Winter Olympics
Italian female cross-country skiers
Tour de Ski skiers
Living people
Olympic cross-country skiers of Italy
Cross-country skiers of Gruppo Sportivo Esercito
People from Aosta
Sportspeople from Aosta Valley